The Suzuki Satria is an underbone motorcycle manufactured by Suzuki, first released as a 2-stroke in Indonesia in 1997. Many subsequent models have been launched since then. Major change was the release of the 4-stroke Satria F in 2005, and fuel-injected Satria FI in 2016.

The first type was released in 1997, with the second and third following in 2002 and 2005. The third model is sold as the Belang 150 in Malaysia, and Raider 150 in the Philippines. The fourth model was introduced in 2016, with the engine now fuel-injected, and shared with the GSX-R150, albeit with different gear ratios in the transmission, different injectors and different tuning in the ECM.

The name "Satria" means "knight" in Indonesian.

Specifications

References

External links 

 
 Official Blog

Satria
Motorcycles introduced in 1997